The Ministry of Agricultural Development and Irrigation (MIDAGRI) is the government ministry in charge of the agricultural sector. , the minister is Andrés Alencastre.

Overview
It was created by Law 9711 on January 2, 1943 by the government of president Manuel Prado Ugarteche. Its main function is the overseeing and regulation of the agrarian sector of the country.

Organization
The Ministry of Agricultural Development and Irrigation is organized into:
Minister of Agricultural Development and Irrigation
Viceminister of Agriculture
Secretary General
Agrarian Advisory Council
Internal Auditing Office 
Public Attorney 
General Office of Agrarian Planning 
General Office of Legal Assistance 
General Administration Office 
General Directorate of Agricultural Information
General Directorate of Agricultural Promotion 
Regional Agricultural Governing Bodies 
Agricultural Agencies

Objectives
1. Fortify agriculturally producing organizations and to promote their integration under the focus of managing watersheds and production chains.

2. Encouraging technological innovations and training directed towards agricultural producers by providing technical assistance.

3. Establishing a system of agricultural information allowing producers to have an efficient decision-making process for their business.

4. Facilitate agricultural producers with access to legal, administrative, management, financial, technical, sanitary, and other assistance permitting the producer to better their enterprise.

5. To facilitate the articulation of smallholder agriculture to a market economy, by establishing policies for the proper use of natural resources.

List of Ministers of Agriculture

See also
Council of Ministers of Peru
External Website
Government of Peru

Agricultural organisations based in Peru
Agriculture
Peru
Peru, Agriculture